Korea–Poland relations may refer to:

 Poland–North Korea relations
 Poland–South Korea relations